The 1991 Virginia Slims of California was a women's tennis tournament played on indoor carpet courts at the Oakland Coliseum Arena in Oakland, California in the United States and was part of the Tier II category of the 1991 WTA Tour. It was the 20th edition of the tournament ran from November 4 through November 10, 1991. Second-seeded Martina Navratilova won the singles title and earned $70,000 first-prize money as well as 300 ranking points.

Finals

Singles
 Martina Navratilova defeated  Monica Seles 6–3, 3–6, 6–3
 It was Navratilova's 5th singles title of the year and the 157th of her career.

Doubles
 Patty Fendick /  Gigi Fernández defeated  Martina Navratilova /  Pam Shriver 6–4, 7–5
 It was Fendick's 4th doubles title of the year and the 14th of her career. It was Fernández' 4th doubles title of the year and the 23rd of her career.

References

External links
 Official website
 ITF tournament edition details
 Tournament draws

Virginia Slims of California
Silicon Valley Classic
Virginia Slims of California
Virginia Slims of California
Virginia Slims of California